Bohicon/Cana Airport  is a public use airport located 3 nm south-southwest of Bohicon, Zou, Benin.

References

External links 
 Airport record for Bohicon/Cana Airport at Landings.com
 

Airports in Benin
Zou Department